Kovilacheri is a village in the Kumbakonam taluk of Thanjavur district, Tamil Nadu, India.

Demographics 

As per the 2001 census, Kovilacheri had a total population of 1505 with 732 males and 773 females. The sex ratio was 1056. The literacy rate was 66.02

References 

 

Villages in Thanjavur district